Henderson is an unincorporated community in Webster County, in the U.S. state of Missouri.

History
Henderson was platted in 1880, and named in honor of "Uncle Sam" Henderson, a pioneer citizen.  The Henderson post office closed in 1905.

References

Unincorporated communities in Webster County, Missouri
Unincorporated communities in Missouri